The Elephanta is a strong southerly or southeasterly wind which blows on the Malabar coast of India during the months of September and October and marks the onset of the southwest monsoon.

References
http://ggweather.com/winds.html

Winds
Environment of Kerala